Jolene Nicole Henderson (born November 14, 1991) is an American, former collegiate All-American, professional All-Star, right-handed hitting softball pitcher and first baseman and softball Assistant Coach, originally from Elk Grove, California. She was a starting pitcher for the California Golden Bears from 2010-13 where she is the career leader in wins and was a 4-time All-Pac-12 player. She is the reigning National Pro Fastpitch Pitcher of The Year after being drafted #3 overall in 2013 and currently ranks top-10 in career wins, ERA, WHIP and fielding percentage and is on the roster for the independent softball team the USSSA Pride. She also played on the United States women's national softball team in 2014.

Early life 
Henderson played softball at Sheldon High School, graduating in 2009.

College career 
Henderson kicked off her career by being named a Second Team All-Pac-12 selection. She debuted on February 12, striking out two batters in a loss to the Texas A&M Aggies. Later she pitched a perfect game on May 21 vs. the Bucknell Bison, striking out 10 in 5-innings.

For Henderson's sophomore year, she was named First Team All-Pac-12, conference Pitcher of the Year and a National Fastpitch Coaches' Association First Team All-American. She set a school record for her 40 wins and also set career bests in strikeouts, ERA, shutouts and innings pitched, helping her to a conference pitching Triple Crown. Henderson also threw two no-hitters. The Bears returned to the Women's College World Series with Henderson's arm and earned a victory before losing to the Florida Gators on June 4.

As a junior, Henderson recaptured identical honors from the Pac-12 conference and the NFCA. She also achieved a career best in strikeout ratio (8.2) and batting average. On March 13, Henderson suffered a 10-inning loss to the Hawaii Rainbow Wahine but struck out a career best 16 batters. She would help the Bears to a No. 1 seed and make it the semifinals of the World Series before being eliminated on June 3 by the eventual champions the Alabama Crimson Tide.

For a final season, Henderson again earned First-Team conference honors and was named to the NFCA Second Team. Henderson would post her best season WHIP, RBIs, home runs and toss a no-hitter. In a victory against the Indiana Hoosiers on February 10, she would embark on a 25 consecutive win streak that was halted by the Arizona Wildcats on April 3. For the streak she pitched 167.1 innings and surrendered 93 hits, 16 earned runs, 28 walks and struck out 170 batters for a 0.67 ERA and 0.72 WHIP while holding opponents to .158 batting average. For the second win that season, she defeated the UC Davis Aggies for her 100th career win. During the streak on March 6, the Golden Bear ended one of the victories over the Pacific Tigers by shutting them down for the last 1.2 innings and would not allow a run for 42.1 consecutive innings before the Syracuse Orange broke through with a run in 5th inning of another win on March 15. Henderson won all 7 games allowing 12 hits and 5 walks, striking out 40 batters and totaling a 0.40 WHIP. Finally, for another win during her streak, she fanned 15 Sacramento State Hornets for a career high in a regulation game.

Henderson would graduate as the Cal career wins leader and rank top-5 in strikeouts, shutouts and innings pitched. She would also place top-10 in both the Pac-12 and NCAA Division I for her victories at 4th and 9th respectively. In 2013, she graduated with a bachelor's degree in American Studies.

Team USA (2014)
Henderson made the United States women's national softball team in 2014. She helped the squad win a gold medal in the World Cup of Softball that year.

After the World Cup of Softball that year, she spent some time playing in Japan for a team named Denso.

National Pro Fastpitch

Texas Charge (2015) 
On January 27, 2015, Henderson became the first player to sign in franchise history for the new Texas Charge (then called the “Dallas Charge”). In her debut, Henderson threw a 6-hitter in a 4-1 win against the USSSA Pride on June 15. In a loss to the Pennsylvania Rebellion on July 14, Henderson struck out a career best 10 batters.

USSSA Pride (2016-present) 
On May 10, 2016, the USSSA Pride signed Henderson to a three-year contract to solidify their pitching rotation. She has played for them since then. In 2017, Henderson began a win streak by posting three victories to end the year.

During the 2018 season, she was named the NPF Pitcher of The Year, and also helped lead her team to the Cowles Cup Championship with a perfect season. This resulted in a 14 consecutive win streak that began at the end of the 2017 season. For that streak, Henderson tossed 96.1 innings pitched and accumulated 47 hits, 8 earned runs, 18 walks and 72 strikeouts for a 0.58 ERA and 0.67 WHIP.

During the 2019 season, she was again named the NPF Pitcher of The Year and won back-to-back Cowles Cup Championships, contributing 5 shutout innings. On July 1, Henderson defeated the Beijing Eagles with a perfect game.

Coaching career 
On September 25, 2018, Florida Gators softball head coach Tim Walton announced that Henderson would be joining the team as an assistant coach.

Statistics

California Golden Bears

External links
https://twitter.com/jolenecal54?lang=en

References 

1991 births
Living people
Softball players from California